A scope clause is part of a contract between a major airline and the trade union of its pilots that limit the number and size of aircraft that may be flown by the airline's regional airline affiliate.

Airlines 
The scope clause's goal is to protect the union pilots' jobs at the major airline from being outsourced by limiting the regional airlines' passenger capacity. These clauses exist primarily in the United States, Canada, and Mexico.

Scope clauses are supported as a means of saving union jobs. Major airline pilots are usually higher paid than regional pilots. Criticism of scope clauses centers on the limits they place on the regional airlines they target. They are a way of artificially maintaining the pay of major airline pilots when regional pilots will in theory fly the same-sized airplanes for less pay.

Scope clauses place restrictions on how many and what size of aircraft a regional airline may operate. Some holding companies operate a large number of individual airlines, with each airline's fleet specifically tuned to the scope clause of that airline's contracted major carrier.

Within American Airlines, regional flying between specific cities listed in contract may not exceed 1.25 percent of mainline block hours CRJ-900 and E175 aircraft that used to fly for US Airways, and their future replacements, are grandfathered in to the seat limitation and may operate with 79 or 80 seats, respectively.

At Delta Air Lines, 85% of flying have to be less than 900 miles, and 90% of flying will be to and from hubs.
For United Airlines, regional block hours must be less than mainline block hours. Mainline routes flown in last 24 months are prohibited unless United could not earn an adequate return.

Aircraft manufacturers 
Scope clauses have a major influence on manufacturers of regional aircraft. Manufacturers will create airplanes specifically tuned to the scope clauses of most airlines. For this reason and others, regional aircraft tend to be manufactured in families, and competing regional aircraft will often have identical seating capacity.

[*] Indicates aircraft is no longer in production

Timeline 

In 2012, American Airlines, Delta Air Lines and United Airlines capped their regional airlines' jets at 76 seats and a maximum take-off weight (MTOW) at 86,000 lb (39 t).
Between 2013 and 2017, Embraer booked nearly 400 E175 orders in U.S., besting the CRJ900 by over 4 to 1.
Delta Air Lines was reported in December 2017 it had maxed out on its 153 allowable 76-seat aircraft, and was forced to fly its 102 70-seaters.
The E170 has six less business seats but the E175 has 70 seats, keeping the same premium seats with  more range than the E170 or the CRJ700.
SkyWest ordered 30 E175SCs for Delta to enter service in 2018.
The E175SC is sold at E170 pricing, a 76-seat retrofit have to go through Embraer.

The 76 seats and 86,000 lb (39 t) MTOW limits could not be amended through negotiations until 2019 at United and 2020 at Delta and American, limiting the sales of the new Mitsubishi SpaceJet M90 and Embraer 175-E2 to the smaller M100 and E175.

United Airlines has been renegotiating its agreement with the Air Line Pilots Association (ALPA) after it became amendable on January 31, 2019. , "noneconomic" matters relating to pilot scheduling had been agreed and ALPA expected to start discussion of scope aspects. United is seeking to fly more aircraft in the 76-seat category, given that no manufacturers currently produce 50-seaters. ALPA wishes to tie scope discussions to United's overall fleet, including wide-body aircraft, whereas the current contract links regional restrictions only to the narrow-body fleet size.
Any agreement reached with United is expected to set a standard for subsequent negotiations with Delta Air Lines and American Airlines, whose pilot contracts become amendable in December 2019 and in 2020, respectively.

In February 2019, Bombardier launched the CRJ550, a 50-seat variant of its CRJ700. The reduced seating capacity and maximum takeoff weight were specifically designed to comply with scope clauses. United had been pushing to renegotiate the clauses, whereas pilots were arguing against what they see as a "flawed strategy of outsourcing". The decision to reconfigure larger existing models implies that the scope clauses remain frozen.

The Embraer 175-E2 first flew on December 12, 2019. The Mitsubishi SpaceJet program was suspended in October 2020, and then cancelled in 2023. This left the US market with Embraer 175 as the only US scope clause compatible jet engine aircraft still in production.

References 

Trade unions
Civil aviation